is a Japanese commercial bank that offers service in 19 branches in Japan and in 2 overseas representative offices (as of July 2012).

History

Aozora Bank is the successor of the Nippon Credit Bank (NCB), which was founded in 1957 as the Nippon Fudosan Bank under a special government trust banking license alongside the Long-Term Credit Bank of Japan (LTCB). Nippon Fudosan Bank was itself based on the remaining assets of the Bank of Joseon in Japan.

In December 1998, NCB was brought under government control in order to deal with its extraordinary amount of bad debt left over from the crash of the Japanese asset price bubble in the early 1990s: at the time, the bank was approximately ¥270 billion in debt.

An investor group led by Softbank, Orix and Tokio Marine & Fire Insurance Co. purchased NCB in 2000 for ¥80 billion. A similar provision had controversially been offered to the purchasers of LTCB, which had recently been similarly purchased from the government and renamed Shinsei Bank. Aozora applied this provision conservatively in order to write off ¥400 billion in bad debts owed by about 100 companies, in contrast to Shinsei Bank, the contemporaneous successor of the Long-Term Credit Bank, which wrote off nearly three times as much and was criticized in political circles for doing so.

The sale of NCB to Softbank was viewed as a precedent for the licensing of Sony Bank, Seven Bank and other new banking platforms in Japan.

The bank was renamed "Aozora" in 2001. Softbank initially planned to make Aozora an investment bank for internet-related companies. However, Softbank was unsuccessful in obtaining the cooperation of the Financial Services Agency, and sold its 49% stake to Cerberus Capital Management in September 2003 for ¥101 billion. Aozora launched operations as a retail bank on April 1, 2006, and opened its first new branch in Nihonbashi on November 20.

Aozora Bank was listed as the No. 1 unsecured creditor to Lehman Brothers with about US$463 million in bank loans to the investment bank as it filed for Chapter 11 bankruptcy in September 2008. By comparison, the second largest unsecured creditor was Mizuho Bank with $289 million, and third largest Citibank (Hong Kong branch) with $275 million.

On December 16, 2008, Aozora Bank announced that it had ¥12.4 billion exposure to the Bernard L. Madoff ponzi scheme.

On April 25, 2009, Aozora Bank and Shinsei Bank announced negotiations to integrate their operations in the summer of 2010, with an eye toward an eventual merger. Banks had been hit by losses in the US subprime market. The talks collapsed in May 2010 amid disputes over capitalization and business strategy, as well as the abatement of the 2008 financial crisis.

Aozora acquired Japan Wealth Management Securities in 2011, merging it with existing subsidiary Aozora Securities in 2012.

In January 2013, Cerberus announced that it would sell most of its stake in Aozora, cutting its total share from 58 percent to 7.7 percent. Cerberus sold this last portion of its stake to Barclays for distribution to other investors in August 2013, ending Cerberus's shareholding in Aozora.

Locations

Aozora's head office is located in the Kudan area of Chiyoda City, Tokyo, near Yasukuni Shrine.

The bank has retail branches in Chiba, Fukuoka, Hiroshima, Kanazawa, Kyoto, Nagoya, Osaka (Namba and Umeda), Sapporo, Sendai, Takamatsu, Tokyo (Ikebukuro, Jiyugaoka, Nihonbashi, Shibuya, Shinjuku and Ueno) and Yokohama.

Aozora also has representative offices in New York, Singapore, Seoul, Jakarta and Shanghai, and financing subsidiaries in the Cayman Islands, Hong Kong, Luxembourg, the United Kingdom and the United States.

See also
List of investors in Bernard L. Madoff Securities
List of banks
List of banks in Japan

References

Cerberus Capital Management companies
Banks of Japan
Banks established in 1957
Companies listed on the Tokyo Stock Exchange
Financial services companies based in Tokyo
1957 establishments in Japan